The Singapore History Gallery is a  gallery located within the vicinity of the National Museum of Singapore. The gallery adopts a story-telling approach, unveiling different perspectives through tales of the past.

Renovation 
The history gallery have gone through some major renovations to improve facilities and to create a new experience for visitors in the museum.

Experience 
When visitors walk into the gallery's main entrance on level 1, they are welcomed by the nice breeze of the multimedia projections of a map of Singapore from 1700s made by a European traveller who navigated the world in that century.

Exhibits 
The exhibits that are found in the gallery are found below:
 Sejarah Singapura
 Founding in 1819 (1800 - 1825)
 Straits Settlements (1825 - 1867)
 Crown Colony (1867 - 1941)
 Battle of Singapore (1941 - 1942)
 Japanese Occupation (1942 - 1945)
 Post-War Period (1945 - 1949)
 Self-Governance (1950s)
 Merger (1963 - 1964)
 Independence (1960s & 1970s)
 Modern Developments (1980s & 1990s)
 Singapore Millennium (2000 - 2015)
 The Future Singapore (which is after SG50)
 In Memoriam: Lee Kuan Yew

Battle of Singapore and Japanese Occupation

Well before World War II began, the British had developed the “Singapore strategy” to defend the British empire in Asia. In Singapore, they built a naval base at Sembawang, strengthened the air force and installed large 15-inch coastal guns. Singapore became known as the “Gibraltar of the East” or “Fortress Singapore”.

At the same time, the outbreak of the Second Sino-Japanese War in 1937 stirred up the Chinese community in Singapore. They formed “patriotic” organisations, which raised funds for China’s war effort and organised boycotts of Japanese goods and businesses.

On 8 December 1941, Singapore experienced war for the first time when the Japanese bombed the city. On the same day, Japanese troops landed on the northeast coast of Malaya and began their invasion. After a swift 70-day campaign, the Japanese – to almost everyone’s surprise – defeated the British and occupied the Malay Peninsula and Singapore.

The British surrendered on 15 February 1942. Singapore was placed under military occupation and renamed Syonan-To (“Light of the South” in Japanese). While the war continued elsewhere, the Singapore population struggled with food and fuel shortages, disease and, at its worst, violence and harassment from the Japanese. The occupation ended only when Japan surrendered to the Allies in 1945.

Independence

In February 2012, the Toh Chin Chye's exhibit (which is Deputy Prime Minister and the Singapore flag) was also added into the Singapore History Gallery.

Modern Developments

Modern Developments showcases the brief history including the late 1990s, at least where Ng Pei Seng placed his D&T semi-preserved exhibit, that is from 1999.

Singapore Millennium

Singapore Millennium also showcases the PSI readings in the year 2006, 2010, 2013 and 2014 due to the Southeast Asian haze.

In Memoriam: Lee Kuan Yew

In Memoriam: Lee Kuan Yew is an exhibit dedicated for the late Lee Kuan Yew, who had died on 23 March 2015. The exhibits will include the following:
Lee Kuan Yew's barrister robe
Rolex Oyster Perpetual watch
Two of the late Lee Kuan Yew's jackets
Charcoal and ink drawing of Lee Kuan Yew
A desk that Lee Kuan Yew worked over the years red briefcase for local use

See also
Goh Seng Choo Gallery
National Museum of Singapore
Singapore Living Galleries

References

National Museum Reveals the Entire Collection of William Farquhar’s Natural History Drawings
The Companion Now Comes in Chinese!
The National Museum of Singapore Reaches Out to the Malay Community with the Malay Companion
National Museum's Gallery Companion Goes Japanese
The Making of the Singapore History Gallery: Some Personal Reflections
Singapore History Gallery

External links
Official Website
National Museum of Singapore Website
Singapore History Gallery Credits
VR Tour of Singapore History Gallery:14th Century Section
VR Tour of Singapore History Gallery:Japanese Occupation Section

National Museum of Singapore